Finswimming competitions at the 2021 Southeast Asian Games took place at Mỹ Đình Aquatics Center in Hanoi, Vietnam from 21 to 22 May 2022.

Medal table

Medalists

Men

Women

Mixed

References

Finswimming
Finswimming at multi-sport events